Events in the year 1882 in India.

Incumbents
Empress of India – Queen Victoria
 Viceroy of India – George Robinson, 1st Marquess of Ripon

Events
 National income - 4,095 million

Law
Powers Of Attorney Act
Transfer Of Property Act
Presidency Small Cause Courts Act
Code Of Civil Procedure
Indian Trust Act
Indian Easements Act
Documentary Evidence Act (British statute)
Reserve Forces Act (British statute)

Births
1 July – Bidhan Chandra Roy, second Chief Minister of West Bengal (d.1962).
11 December – Subramanya Bharathi, poet, independence fighter and reformer (d.1921).

Deaths
6 January – Bharatendu Harishchandra, writer and poet (b.1850).

 
India
Years of the 19th century in India